The Hammond Museum and Japanese Stroll Garden, in North Salem, New York, is a museum with Japanese art and a 7-acre Japanese stroll garden in Westchester County. The museum offers changing exhibits, lectures, and programs that reflect the intersection of Eastern and Western cultures.

The museum was established in 1957 by Natalie Hays Hammond (1904-1985) as a place where Eastern and Western cultures could be appreciated. In 1979, she was awarded the Medallion Award of the Westchester Community College Foundation for founding the Hammond Museum and her art.

References

External links
 Hammond Museum and Japanese Stroll Garden

Art museums and galleries in New York (state)
Museums in Westchester County, New York
Art museums established in 1957
Japanese gardens in the United States
Gardens in New York (state)